The Balochistan High Court is the highest judicial institution of Balochistan, Pakistan. The court is formally known as the High Court of Balochistan. It is situated in the provincial capital, Quetta.

Mir Ali Dost Bugti was the first judge of the Balochistan High Court. Justice Naeem Akhtar Afghan is the current Chief Justice, having taken charge on 9 August 2021.

Bar Council 

The Balochistan Bar Council is a statutory & deliberative assembly of lawyers in Balochistan for safeguarding the rights, interests, and privileges of practicing lawyers within Balochistan province, Pakistan. The Council also regulates the conduct of lawyers and helps in the administration of justice. It has been constituted by Section 3(ii) of the Legal Practitioners and Bar Councils Act, 1973 of the constitution of Pakistan. All lower court and High Court lawyers within Balochistan are licensed with this council.
The Balochistan Bar Council consists of a Vice Chairman, & Chairman Executive Committee, both elected by Members of the Balochistan Bar Council each year and these Members are elected by the advocates from four (04) Groups of different constituencies across Balochistan Province. Members serve a term of five years, beginning on January 1, with elections held each November to fill seats of those whose terms will expire in the following January. The Advocate General of Balochistan acts as ex-officio Chairman of the Balochistan Bar Council.

Justices of the Balochistan High Court
The Balochistan High Court is headed by a Chief Justice. The bench consists of Justices and additional judges. The retirement age of the Chief Justice and the Justices is 62 years. The Additional Judges are initially appointed for one year. After that, their services could either be extended or they could be confirmed or they are retired.

Current composition 
The High Court of Balochistan is currently made up of the following Justices (in order of seniority). In January 2018, the President of Pakistan increased the number of judges from eleven to fifteen.

PCO 25 March 1981
Khuda Baksh Mari: Did not take oath under the Provisional Constitutional Order, being the chief justice
Zakaullah Lodhi: Took oath under PCO to become the chief justice
Abdul Qadeer Chaudhri  Took oath under PCO (on requests of fellow lawmakers and jurists)
Mir Hazar Khan Khoso Took oath under PCO
Justice(R) M.A Rasheed also did not take oath under PCO

PCO 26 January 2000
Iftikhar Muhammad Chaudhry Took oath under PCO, was chief justice
Javed Iqbal Took oath under PCO
Raja Fayaz Ahmed Took oath under PCO
Amanullah Khan Yasinzai Took oath under PCO
Fazal ur Rehman Took oath under PCO

PCO 3 November 2007
Amanullah Khan Yasinzai took oath under PCO, was chief justice
Ahmed Khan Lashari took oath under PCO
Akhtar Zaman Malghani took oath under PCO
Nadir Khan Durani took oath under PCO
Mehta Kelash Nath took oath under PCO

List of retired judges
Khuda Bakhsh Marri  	21-10-1970	25-03-1981
Abdul Hayee Qureshi 	07-02-1972	23-07-1978
M.A Rasheed 		08-10-1977	18-09-1978
Zakaullah Lodhi  	01-12-1976	19-10-1984
Mir Hazar Khan Khoso  	20-06-1977	29-09-1991
Abdul Qadeer Chaudhary 20-06-1977	13-12-1989
Muhammad Jaffar Naim 	14-05-1981	23-02-1985
Muftikhar-ud-Din 	22-05-1982	09-03-1990
Ajmal Mian		17-03-1980	29-03-1987
Munawar Ahmed Mirza 	31-03-1985	16-11-1996
Nazir Ahmed Bhatti 	03-04-1985	07-09-1987
Amir-ul-Mulk Mengal 	26-03-1986	22-04-1999
Iftikhar Muhammad Chaudhary 	06-04-1990	04-02-2000

Muhammad Nawaz Marri 	07-03-1996	07-01-2000
Javed Iqbal		07-03-1996	28-04-2000
Raja Fayyaz Ahmed	27-01-1997	14-09-2005
Amanullah Khan		27-01-1997	5-08-2009
Fazal-ur-Rahman 	21.06.1999	12-04-2005
Ahmed Khan Lashari	06-09-2000	5-08-2009
Tariq Mehmood 		06-09-2000	16-04-2002
Akhtar Zaman		05-09-2002	5-08-2009
Nadir Khan		05-09-2002	5-08-2009
Kelash Nath		26-11-2004	5-08-2009

See also 
Balochistan Judicial Academy
Balochistan Bar Council
Sindh High Court
Lahore High Court
Peshawer High Court
Islamabad High Court
Supreme Court of Pakistan

References

External links 

 Official website

 
High Courts of Pakistan